Mandi Kowal (born June 16, 1963) is a retired American lightweight rower. She won a gold medal at the 1984 World Rowing Championships in Montreal, Canada, with the lightweight women's eight; this was the only year that this boat class competed at World Rowing Championships. She then switched to the lightweight women's four and became world champion at the 1986 World Rowing Championships, and again at the 1987 World Rowing Championships. At the 1988 World Rowing Championships in Milan, Italy, she came fourth.

Kowal resides in Iowa City.

References

1963 births
Living people
American female rowers
World Rowing Championships medalists for the United States
Sportspeople from Iowa City, Iowa
21st-century American women